The Botanical Garden of Lourizán is an arboretum of some 54 hectares in the municipality of Pontevedra in Spain. It has more than 850 catalogued species and one of the largest collections in Spain. It is the most important botanical garden in Galicia.

Location 
The Lourizán Arboretum is located on the northern slopes of the Morrazo massif, at the end of the Pontevedra Ria, between Pontevedra and Marín, about 3 kilometres from the centre of Pontevedra.

History 
The origins of the property date back to the 15th century, when it was still a farm. The arboretum was created in 1949 with exotic and Galician species.

In the 19th century, the estate was acquired by the politician Eugenio Montero Ríos, who made the Lourizán Palace his summer residence and a meeting place for the most prominent Spanish figures of the time. 

In 1943, by order of the Ministry of National Education on 25 February, the Lourizán estate was created in Pontevedra, donated for this purpose by the Pontevedra Provincial Council. The study of fast-growing forest species was started there, with the aim of satisfying the Spanish needs for wood in those years.

The estate and palace of Lourizán were the place of practice for the students of the Madrid School of Forestry Engineers until it became part of the Galician Government. This autonomous government created the Lourizán Forest and Environment Research Centre in its facilities.

Description 
In this botanical garden, there are 700 different species and more than 1900 trees from all over the world, many of which are of great size. Among them, a cedar of Lebanon over 130 years old and the oldest metasequoia in the Iberian Peninsula and one of the tallest in Europe, which has been in Lourizán since 1951.

Since 1993, the Parque das Autonomías has been located inside the park, with almost 50 species of flora representative of the different autonomous communities of Spain. There are also areas dedicated to the flora of Taiwan and Australia, as well as the Eucaliptetetum and Coniferetum, with more than 85 and 170 different species respectively.

Many native trees grow on the estate, such as oaks, chestnuts and birches, sycamores and introduced and exotic trees, such as cypresses, araucarias, cedars, magnolias or common privet, many of which were brought in by French gardeners. Several of these trees are included in the Catalogue of Singular Trees of the Galician Government. There are arboretums with all varieties of chestnut trees, pines, eucalyptus or camellias, with the tallest specimen in the world, a 20.5 metre tall Japanese camellia. There is also a rimu from New Zealand and a small Taiwanese garden.  

In the park there is an important collection of Camellias. It is believed that old specimens of camellias from Lourizán belonged to the Portuguese horticultural establishment of José Marques Loureiro in the 19th century.
Most of the Merino herbarium is also located in the arboretum.

Activities of the research centre 
 Genetic improvement.
 Introduction of tree species.

References

See also

Bibliography

Related articles 
 Marismas de Alba Natural Park
 Island of Sculptures
 Alameda de Pontevedra
 Palm Trees Park

External links 
  Arboretum of Lourizán website

Province of Pontevedra
Parks in Spain
Botanical gardens in Spain
Pontevedra
Tourist attractions in Galicia (Spain)
Parks in Pontevedra
Parks in Galicia (Spain)